The Export Promotion Industrial Park, also known as EPIP, is a multiple-product export processing zone in Bihar and East India developed by the Ministry of Commerce and Industry, the Government of Bihar, and by the administrative body BIADA located in Hajipur, the zonal headquarter of the East Central Railway Zone.  The Export Promotion Industrial Park of Hajipur, in the administrative Vaishali district, has  of land with modern infrastructure.

Colleges and institutions in EPIP Hajipur
EPIP Hajipur has two research institutes in its campus;
 Central Institute of Plastics Engineering & Technology Hajipur
 National Institute of Pharmaceutical Education and Research, Hajipur

Completed Projects
 Nimbus Beverages Pvt.Ltd, Brand Name-Oras
 Pepsico 
 Britania Biscuit
 Sona Biscuit Corporation, Brand Name - Sobisco
 Integrated Logistics Hub & Pack House EPIP, Hajipur
Avon Cycle
 Aggarwal Foods Products Co.(P) Ltd
 Godrej Agrovet Ltd. (GAVL)
Hajipur

References

Economy of Bihar
Foreign trade of India
Industrial parks in India
Hajipur
Export promotion agencies of India